"Coraline" is a gothic rock ballad by Italian rock band Måneskin, from their second studio album, Teatro d'ira: Vol. I (2021). Although it was not released as a single it reached a Top 5 position in Finland, Greece and Lithuania. It received the double platinum certification by FIMI.

Overview
The rock ballad was initially written in hotel room by band's vocalist Damiano David and guitarist Thomas Raggi. According to Thomas Raggi, the song has a progressive composition with an arpeggio. The voice and acoustic guitar from the beginning are later met with electric guitar, bass guitar and drums in a "very theatrical way". According to Ethan Torchio it is a "story with a beginning, a development and an end". As explained by lyrics writer, Damiano David, the girl's name is unrelated to the same-titled novel Coraline by Neil Gaiman, but rather it was inspired by a true story. It is talking about a fragile girl's life which is withering, a knight-errant who is helpless in front of her suffering, and that the "tale ends badly, there is no happy ending".

Charts

Certifications

References

2020 songs
2020s ballads
Italian-language songs
Måneskin songs
Number-one singles in Sweden
Rock ballads
Gothic rock songs
Songs written by Damiano David
Songs written by Victoria De Angelis